Screem Writers Guild is the upcoming eighteenth studio album by the Finnish rock band Lordi. It is set to be released on 31 March 2023, and will be their first album under the label, Atomic Fire Records. The album has been described as not a concept album, but contains a 'cinematic horror movie' theme throughout.

It is the first studio album to feature guitarist Kone, following the departure of the band's original guitarist Amen.

Track listing

Personnel 
Lordi
 Mr Lordi – lead vocals
 Hella – keyboards, backing vocals
 Mana – drums, backing vocals
 Hiisi – bass, backing vocals
 Kone – guitar, backing vocals

References 

2023 albums
Lordi albums
Upcoming albums